Bendisopis is a monotypic moth genus of the family Erebidae erected by George Hampson in 1926. Its only species, Bendisopis remissa, was first described by Francis Walker in 1858. It is found in Venezuela.

References

Calpinae
Monotypic moth genera